Michael Kenneth Williams (November 22, 1966 – September 6, 2021) was an American actor. He rose to fame in 2002 through his critically acclaimed role as Omar Little on the HBO drama series The Wire. He has been described as a "singular presence, onscreen and off, who made every role his own".

Born in Brooklyn, New York City, to a South Carolinian father and a Bahamian mother, Williams enrolled at the National Black Theater. He left school early to pursue a career as a dancer, which resulted in his working with Kym Sims, George Michael, and Madonna, and found work choreographing music videos. His distinctive voice, prominent facial scar, and charisma helped him attain acting work, initially alongside Tupac Shakur in the 1996 film Bullet before being cast in The Wire in 2002. His performance as Omar was widely acclaimed, leading to praise from President Barack Obama and an NAACP Image Award for Outstanding Actor in a Drama Series in 2007.

Williams also played Albert "Chalky" White on the HBO series Boardwalk Empire from 2010 to 2014. He earned five Primetime Emmy Award nominations for his performances in the HBO television biopic Bessie (2015), the Netflix drama series When They See Us (2019), and the HBO series The Night Of (2016) and Lovecraft Country (2020). He had a recurring role in the NBC sitcom Community from 2011 to 2012. He also had supporting roles in a number of films including Gone Baby Gone (2006), The Road (2009), Inherent Vice (2014), and Motherless Brooklyn (2019), as well as starring roles in 12 Years a Slave (2013), Robocop (2014), The Purge: Anarchy (2014), The Gambler (2014), Triple 9 (2016), Ghostbusters (2016), and Assassin's Creed (2016).

Williams acknowledged struggles with fame throughout his life, admitting that he had suffered from drug addictions during the height of his success. He continued to live in Brooklyn until his death in 2021 at age 54, after using heroin laced with a lethal amount of fentanyl. Four men were charged in the aftermath of his death with various crimes, including manslaughter.

Williams' portrayal of Omar Little has been called one of the best in the history of television. With The Wire and other shows such as The Sopranos, Williams was credited with being part of the late 1990s and early 2000s artistic force changing American television into an art form. In the aftermath of his death, he was subject to tributes and appraisal both in the United States and beyond; the British lecturer and writer Kenan Malik wrote of his "power and nuance, seldom seen on screen".

Early life and education
Williams was born on November 22, 1966 in Brooklyn, New York City, the son of Bahamian born Paula Thompson  and Booker T. Williams, an American, from Greeleyville, South Carolina, where his African-American family has deep roots. Williams was raised in the Vanderveer Projects in East Flatbush, Brooklyn, and attended George Westinghouse Career and Technical Education High School. Later, Williams enrolled at the National Black Theatre in New York City.

Career
Williams worked for Pfizer pharmaceuticals as a temp. However, inspired by Janet Jackson's Rhythm Nation 1814, he left school and quit his job, against the wishes of his family, to pursue a career as a dancer. During a year in which he was intermittently homeless, Williams visited record labels and dance studios looking for work. He got a job as a background dancer with singer Kym Sims, which led to more work appearing as a dancer in music videos and on tours with artists such as George Michael and Madonna, as well as some modeling work. He also choreographed Crystal Waters' 1994 single "100% Pure Love".

Williams had a large facial scar he received in a bar fight on his 25th birthday, when he was slashed with a razor blade. The scar became his signature feature, and resulted in offers to perform as a thug in music videos, and modeling opportunities with noted photographers like David LaChapelle. One of his first acting roles was alongside Tupac Shakur as High Top, the brother and henchman to Shakur's drug kingpin Tank, in the 1996 film Bullet. Shakur reportedly decided on Williams for the role after spotting a Polaroid photograph of him in a production studio.

Williams also served as the American Civil Liberties Union celebrity ambassador to the Campaign for Smart Justice. Williams' portrayals of openly gay characters was deemed to be revolutionary.

The Wire

Williams gained recognition as an actor for his portrayal of Omar Little in The Wire, which began filming in 2002. The character was based on Donnie Andrews, along with other crime figures in Baltimore. Williams received the part after a single audition, at the encouragement of writer Ed Burns. He was told that the character was slated to appear in just seven episodes and expected him to be killed by the end of the first season. However, creator David Simon stated that they always planned to keep the character as part of the continuing ensemble should the show be renewed beyond one season.

For his portrayal of Omar, Williams was named by USA Today as "one of ten reasons they still love television". The magazine praised Omar for his uniqueness as a character, and Williams for bringing wit and humor to the portrayal. Omar has been named as one of the first season's richest characters, a Robin Hood of Baltimore's west side projects. The Baltimore City Paper named the character one of their top ten reasons not to cancel the show and called him "arguably the show's single greatest achievement". In 2007, he was nominated for an NAACP Image Award for Outstanding Actor in a Drama Series for his role as Omar.

Williams pursued the role because he was intrigued by Omar's contradictory nature. He felt Omar's popularity stemmed from his honesty, lack of materialism, individuality and his adherence to his strict code. He felt that the role has been a breakthrough in terms of bringing attention to him and getting further roles. Williams received both positive and negative reactions to Omar's homosexuality and felt that he was successful in challenging attitudes and provoking discussion with the role.

In 2008, then-U.S. Senator Barack Obama cited The Wire as his favorite television show, and called Omar his favorite character. About Omar, Obama said, "That's not an endorsement. He's not my favorite person, but he's a fascinating character... he's the toughest, baddest guy on the show."

During his portrayal of Omar, Williams went by his character's name and developed a habit of smoking cannabis and an addiction to cocaine in 2004. Williams lived part-time in Newark, New Jersey using drugs, but sought help from a ministry in neighboring Irvington, which he credited for helping him during the production.

Other work
Williams had a recurring role on J. J. Abrams' Alias. He also had a recurring role on the Abrams-produced Six Degrees. He made brief appearances on CSI: Crime Scene Investigation (playing two different characters on two different seasons), Boston Legal, The Sopranos, Law & Order (playing three different characters on three different seasons), Law & Order: Special Victims Unit (also playing two different characters on two different seasons), Human Giant, and Third Watch.

Williams appeared in The Kill Point as recurring guest star Q, a police sniper, alongside The Wire co-stars J. D. Williams, Michael Hyatt and Leo Fitzpatrick. He auditioned for the starring role of Mr. Cat but was forced to take a smaller role due to scheduling conflicts; the part of Mr. Cat went to J. D. Williams instead. Williams played a Boston area detective named Devin Amronklin in the 2007 film Gone, Baby, Gone. The film is based on a novel by Dennis Lehane, who has written for The Wire, and was adapted and directed by Ben Affleck. Amronklin is a recurring character in Lehane's Kenzie-Genarro series of books. Williams said that he enjoyed working with Affleck and characterized him as a passionate and hands-on director.

Williams played Teddy, the former boyfriend of Nikki Tru (Kerry Washington) in the Chris Rock film I Think I Love My Wife. He played James, a policeman, in singer R. Kelly's video for "Trapped in the Closet". He also appeared in The Game's "Dreams" and "How We Do" music videos, Tony Yayo's "It's a Stick Up" music video and Cam'ron's film Killa Season, as well as Trick Daddy's video "Tuck Your Ice In", Freeway's "How We Do", Sheek Louch's "Good Love", and Young Jeezy's "Bury me a G" alongside his The Wire co-star Hassan Johnson. Williams played the role of The Thief in the 2009 film The Road, an adaptation of the Cormac McCarthy novel of the same name. In 2010, Williams appeared in the film Life During Wartime. The character he played, Allen, was portrayed by Philip Seymour Hoffman in the film's predecessor, Happiness.

Williams also starred in the film A Day in the Life, which was directed by, produced by, and starred rapper Sticky Fingaz. The entire film is a musical with every line being delivered in rap verse. Williams starred in HBO's Boardwalk Empire for its five seasons (2010–2014), appearing as Albert "Chalky" White, the leader of 1920s' Atlantic City's black community.

On July 23, 2011, Community creator Dan Harmon revealed that Williams would star in "at least three episodes" of the sitcom's third season. He played the role of Biology Professor Marshall Kane at Greendale Community College.

In November 2011, it was announced that Williams would appear in Quentin Tarantino's feature film Django Unchained. Williams, who had previously confirmed that he was actually in talks with Tarantino to take on the titular role of Django, was to portray a minor character in the film, but scheduling conflicts with Boardwalk Empire prevented him from doing so.

On May 16, 2012, Williams announced that he was an executive producer of the independent film Snow on tha Bluff, Williams' first film under his company, Freedome Productions. On Power 105.1fm's The Breakfast Club, Williams revealed the June 19 release date for Snow on tha Bluff, describing the movie as "real graphic": "everything that is wrong with the 'hood is in this movie". Williams also shared on The Breakfast Club that he was starring in an African American western, They Die by Dawn, with his co-star Snoop from the HBO series The Wire. Williams also revealed that he was starring in the lead role as rapper Ol' Dirty Bastard (ODB) from the Wu-Tang Clan in the movie Dirty Whiteboy in 2014, which is based on the relationship ODB had with his manager during the last two years of his life. Williams mentioned the role was special to him because he grew up listening to Ol' Dirty Bastard and to Wu-Tang and was also a Brooklyn native.

In 2013, Williams starred in MGMT's music video for "Cool Song No. 2" and  had a cameo appearance in Jay-Z's "Picasso Baby" art film. That same year, Williams appeared in ASAP Rocky's video for "Phoenix".
He was also featured modeling for The Gap's 2014 fall collection. Williams was the voice actor for the character Kimble “Irish” Graves in Battlefield 4.

On March 9, 2015, it was announced that Williams would star in SundanceTV's Hap and Leonard. Also in 2015, Williams appeared in the music video for "The Mephistopheles of Los Angeles" by Marilyn Manson.

In 2016, Williams began working with Vice News, hosting a VICELAND program titled Black Market. In this series, he visits various clandestine markets to explore how they operate while investigating the circumstances that generate their clientele. In 2018, Williams again worked with the Vice team. In "Raised in the System", the extended premiere episode of the sixth season of HBO's Emmy-winning weekly news magazine series Vice, Williams embarked on a personal journey to expose the root of the American mass incarceration crisis: the juvenile justice system.

Williams was originally cast as Dryden Vos, a crime lord, in Solo: A Star Wars Story. However, he exited the role after being unable to return for re-shoots due to scheduling conflicts with The Red Sea Diving Resort. Paul Bettany was cast in his place, with the character being reworked from a motion-capture alien to a human. In 2020, he played Montrose Freeman on the HBO series Lovecraft Country.

Death
Williams was found dead in his apartment in Williamsburg, Brooklyn by his nephew on September 6, 2021, aged 54. On September 24, 2021, the NYC Office of Chief Medical Examiner confirmed that Williams died of a combination of fentanyl, p-fluorofentanyl, heroin, and cocaine, and ruled the death by overdose. His private funeral was held at St. Stephen's Episcopal Cathedral in Harrisburg, Pennsylvania, where his mother lives. In February 2022, police arrested four men in connection with Williams' death.

The Baltimore Ravens played a tribute to Williams by playing his character Omar Little's whistle of the song "The Farmer in the Dell" as part of the team intro all throughout the M&T Bank Stadium. In August 2022, Félix Bautista of the Baltimore Orioles began entering the game to Omar's whistle.

Filmography

Film

Television

Video games

Awards and nominations

References

External links

 
 
 Michael K. Williams on "Larry King Now" 
 

1966 births
2021 deaths
20th-century African-American people
20th-century American dancers
20th-century American male actors
21st-century African-American people
21st-century American dancers
21st-century American male actors
Accidental deaths in New York (state)
African-American male actors
American male film actors
American male television actors
American people of Bahamian descent
American people of Mende descent
American people of Sierra Leonean descent
Borough of Manhattan Community College alumni
Cocaine-related deaths in New York (state)
Dancers from New York (state)
Deaths by heroin overdose in New York (state)
Drug-related deaths in New York City
Male actors from New York City
People from Flatbush, Brooklyn